Felix Kipatarus Koskei (born 1964) is a Kenyan who was nominated by President Uhuru Kenyatta as Cabinet Secretary for Agriculture, Livestock and Fisheries on 25 April 2013.
He is currently the Head of Public Service in President William Ruto's State House.

References

1964 births
University of Nairobi alumni
Government ministers of Kenya
Living people